This is a list of notable left-handed musicians who play their instruments naturally. This does not include left-handed people who play (or played) right-handed, such as Joe Perry, Mark Knopfler, and Gary Moore.

Guitarists and bassists

Left-handed people play guitar or electric bass in one of the following ways: (1) play the instrument truly right-handed, (2) play the instrument truly left-handed, (3) altering a right-handed instrument to play left-handed, or (4) turning a right-handed instrument upside down to pick with the left hand, but not altering the strings – leaving them reversed from the normal order. (The fingering is the same for methods 2 and 3.)  Any style of picking with the left hand (flatpicking or fingerstyle guitar) is considered playing left-handed.

Guitarists

Left-handed with normal stringing
Guitarists in this category pick with their left hand and have the strings in the conventional order for a left-handed player (i.e. the low string on the top side of the neck). They either have true left-handed guitars or have right-handed guitars altered so the strings are correct for a left-handed player. Some guitarists in this category (e.g. Paul McCartney) play both genuine left-handed instruments and right-handed instruments altered for left-handed playing.

Changing the strings on a right-handed guitar involves several things. The nut of the guitar has to be changed to accommodate the string widths. The bridge needs to be changed to make the lower-note (thicker) strings longer than the higher-note (thinner) strings for correct intonation. On almost all acoustic guitars the bracing is non-symmetrical. On electric guitars altered this way, the controls will be backwards.

Notable players

Frank Agnello The Fab Faux
Adrian Borland (The Sound)
Al McKay (Earth, Wind & Fire)
Ali Campbell (ex-UB40)
Anton Cosmo (ex-Boston)
Atahualpa Yupanqui
Austin Carlile (ex-Attack Attack!, Of Mice & Men) 
Barbara Lynn
Barry Winslow (The Royal Guardsmen)
Beeb Birtles (Little River Band)
Ben Howard
Billy Ray Cyrus
Blake Schwarzenbach (Jawbreaker)
Bryan Harvey (House of Freaks)
Calogero (plays guitar and bass left-handed)
Cesar Rosas (Los Lobos)
Cheyenne Kimball
Courtney Barnett
Craig Scanlon (The Fall)
Dave Kilminster (former lefty; originally played left-handed until injury, now exclusively plays right-handed)
Dave King (Flogging Molly)
Davey von Bohlen (The Promise Ring, Cap'n Jazz)
David Cook
David Reilly (God Lives Underwater)
Dickey Lee
Eef Barzelay (Clem Snide)
Elliot Easton (The Cars)
Emma Bale
Eric Bogle
Ernie C (Body Count)
Fyfe Dangerfield (Guillemots)
Georgina "Georgi" Kay
Greg Sage (right-handed, decided to play left-handed with the Wipers) 
Gregor Mackintosh (Paradise Lost)
Gustavo Cordera (Bersuit Vergarabat)
Hayley Kiyoko
Ian Fowles (The Aquabats, Death By Stereo)
Iggy Pop
Imai Hisashi  (Buck-Tick)
Jeffrey Steele (formerly of Boy Howdy)
Jill Barber
Jimi Hendrix (wrote right-handed)
Jo Callis (The Rezillos/The Human League)
Joanna Wang
Jonathan Butler
John Flansburgh (They Might Be Giants)
Josey Scott (Saliva)
Joyce Jonathan (French pop singer)
Justin Bieber
Mark "Kazzer" Kasprzyk (Redlight King/Solo)
Klaus Eichstadt (Ugly Kid Joe)
Kurt Cobain (Nirvana) (wrote right-handed)
Lars Johansson (Candlemass)
William H. "Lefty" Bates
Lukas Rossi can play the guitar with either hand.
Luke Morley (Thunder / The Union)
Mac Powell (Third Day)
Maria Taylor (Azure Ray, Little Red Rocket, Now It's Overhead, solo)
Martin Bramah (The Fall/Blue Orchids)
Mdou Moctar
Nicke Andersson (The Hellacopters, Imperial State Electric)
Ollie Halsall
Omar Rodríguez-López (At the Drive-In/The Mars Volta)
Pasi Koskinen (St. Mucus, Ajattara, To Separate the Flesh from the Bones)
Paul Gray (Slipknot) started out playing right-handed, then changed to left-handed as it was more comfortable being left-handed.
Paul McCartney (The Beatles) first struggled playing right-handed, but then saw a picture of Slim Whitman playing left-handed and realized that he could reverse the guitar, reverse the strings, and pick with the left hand .
Paul Mullen (The Automatic/Young Legionnaire/Yourcodenameis:milo)
Paulo Furtado (Wraygunn/The Legendary Tigerman)
Pernilla Andersson
Perry Bamonte (The Cure)
Ragnar Þórhallsson (Of Monsters and Men)
Rami Yosifov (Teapacks)
Richie Stotts (Plasmatics)
Robin Campbell (UB40)
Ronnie Radke (Falling in Reverse, ex-Escape the Fate) 
Santiago Feliú
Shae Dupuy
Slim Whitman (was right-handed but played guitar left-handed due to loss of his two fingers on the left hand)
Stella Parton
Sylvia Tyson
Ted Gärdestad
Ted Sablay (The Killers)
Christian Savill (Slowdive)
Templeton Thompson (female country singer-songwriter)
Tim Armstrong (Rancid)
Tony Iommi (Black Sabbath)
Toronzo Cannon
Willie Duncan (Spider Murphy Gang)
Will Glover (The Pyramids)
Verónica Romero
Vicentico
Zacky Vengeance (Avenged Sevenfold; started to play right-handed but then shortly moved to left-handed playing)
Andrew "Whitey" White (Kaiser Chiefs)
Michael Zakarin (The Bravery)

Left-handed with strings backwards
These are left-handed players who play naturally, but with the strings organized to emulate an unaltered right-handed guitar, thus the strings are backwards for a left-handed player. The guitar is held left-handed with the high string on the top side of the neck (e.g. Bob Geldof). Some players in this category (e.g. Dick Dale and Albert King) had left-handed guitars with the strings as on a right-handed guitar, since they had learned to play that way.

Notable players

Amber Bain (The Japanese House)
Babyface
Dywane Thomas Jr.
Cormac Battle (Kerbdog)
Buddy Miles
Wallis Bird
Doyle Bramhall II
Chase Bryant
Glen Burtnik (Styx/solo)
Eddy Clearwater
Junior Campbell
Michael Card
Jimmy Cliff
Elizabeth Cotten 
 Andrew Cox (The Fauves)
Dick Dale 
Ed Deane
Cheick Hamala Diabate (RH instruments with original stringing and custom LH instruments with backwards stringing) also banjo and ngoni
Lefty Dizz
Eric Gales (naturally right-handed, but plays left-handed. His left-handed brother taught him that way.)
Bob Geldof (The Boomtown Rats)
Jimi Goodwin (Doves)
Ed Harcourt
Benn Jordan
Jacek Kaczmarski
Andy Kerr
Albert King
Little Jimmy King
Peter LeMarc
Anika Moa
Barry Winslow (The Royal Guardsmen)
Morgan
Coco Montoya
Malina Moye
Mic Murphy, (The System) 
Kurt Nilsen (Winner of the World Idol competition after winning the first season of the Norwegian Idol series)
Paul Raymond
Nicolas Reyes
Gruff Rhys
Kris Roe (The Ataris)
Jim Rooney
 Doctor Isaiah Ross
Otis Rush
Graham Russell (Air Supply)
Lætitia Sadier (McCarthy, Monade, Stereolab)
Evie Sands
Seal
Dan Seals
Bill Staines
Dan Swanö (Bloodbath, Edge of Sanity, Nightingale, Ribspreader; plays drums right-handed) 
Wayman Tisdale
Dave Wakeling (The English Beat, General Public) (right-handed, but learned to play left-handed)
Karl Wallinger (World Party)
Bobby Womack
Melvin Williams

Unclassified left-handed players

Michael Angelo Batio (plays a double-guitar ambidextrously)
Shirlie Holliman (Pepsi & Shirlie)
Jon Oliva
Peter Plate (Rosenstolz)
Emily Robins (The Elephant Princess)
Arif Sağ (plays bağlama left-handed)
John Schumann
Lari White
Wendy Wild
Mick Flannery

Bassists

Jarkko Ahola (Teräsbetoni/Northern Kings/Raskasta Joulua/solo; plays both guitar and bass with strings backwards)
Martin Eric Ain (Celtic Frost)
Rosemary Butler (Formerly Birtha; now backing and solo vocalist)
Gerald Casale (Devo; plays strings backwards)
Ken Casey (Dropkick Murphys)
Stuart Chatwood (The Tea Party)
Flavio Cianciarulo (Los Fabulosos Cadillacs/De la tierra/solo) plays with strings in correct order, both guitar and bass.
Nick Feldman (Wang Chung)
Gary Fletcher (The Blues Band) plays bass upside down
Kathy Foster (The Thermals)
Keith Ferguson (The Fabulous Thunderbirds)
Ed Gagliardi (Foreigner; naturally right-handed, played left-handed)
Jimi Goodwin (Doves; plays both guitar and bass with strings backwards)
Karl Green (Herman's Hermits)
Paul Gray (Slipknot)
Jimmy Haslip (Yellowjackets; plays with strings reversed)
Yoko Hikasa (Ho-kago Tea Time)
Colin Hodgkinson (Back Door, Whitesnake)
Lee Jackson (The Nice)
Joe Long (Frankie Valli and the Four Seasons) 
Alan Longmuir (Bay City Rollers; plays both guitar and bass with strings reversed)
Paul McCartney (The Beatles/Wings/solo) plays with strings in correct order, both guitar and bass; plays drums right-handed
Robbie Merrill (Godsmack) actually right-handed, but plays guitar left-handed because of a birth defect that disabled the middle finger of his left hand.
Josh Newton (Every Time I Die)
Doug Pinnick (King's X)
Scott Reeder (Kyuss/The Obsessed/Unida; plays with strings reversed)
Brad Savage (Band from TV)
Danielle Nicole Schnebelen (Trampled Under Foot)
Jeff Schmidt (Bass Soloist, plays with strings reversed)
Wayman Tisdale (played with strings reversed)
Mark White (Spin Doctors)
Paul Wilson (Snow Patrol)
Pete Wright (Crass)
A. W. Yrjänä (CMX)

Drummers

A drum kit for a left-handed person is set up so that percussion instruments drummers would normally play with their right hand (ride cymbal, floor tom, etc.) are played with the left hand. The bass drum and hi-hat configurations are also set up so that the drummer plays the bass drum with their left foot, and operate the hi-hat (or, if using two bass drums, plays the second bass drum)  with their right foot. Some drummers however have been known to play right-handed kits, but play leading with their left hand (e.g. playing open-handed on the hi-hat). This list does not include drummers who are naturally left-handed while playing drums purely right-handed such as Stewart Copeland, Dave Lombardo, Travis Barker, Eric Carr, and Chris Adler.

Nicke Andersson (Entombed)
Oli Beaudoin (Neuraxis, Kataklysm)
Carter Beauford (Dave Matthews Band) plays on a right-handed drum kit, frequently open-handed.
Rich Beddoe (Finger Eleven)
Jim Bonfanti (Raspberries) plays open-handed
Mike Bordin (Ozzy Osbourne, Faith No More) uses a right-handed setup, but with his primary ride cymbal on his left.
Bun E. Carlos (Cheap Trick) alternates between left-handed and right-handed playing
Régine Chassagne (Arcade Fire) plays a right-handed kit, but leads with left hand
Billy Cobham (Miles Davis, Mahavishnu Orchestra, solo), plays a right-handed kit.
Phil Collins (Genesis, solo)
Scott Columbus (Manowar)
Charles Connor (Little Richard)
Steve Coy (Dead or Alive), plays on a left-handed kit, but leads with right hand 
Jonny Cragg (Spacehog)
Joe Daniels (Local H)
Micky Dolenz (The Monkees) right-handed, but plays open-handed on a left-handed kit.
Shawn Drover (Megadeth, Eidolon) plays open-handed
Joe English (Paul McCartney and Wings)
Joshua Eppard (Coheed and Cambria) right-handed, but plays open-handed
Fenriz (Darkthrone) plays guitar right-handed
Ginger Fish (Marilyn Manson, Rob Zombie)
Jeff Friedl (A Perfect Circle)
Mike Gibbins (Badfinger)
Zachary Hanson (Hanson)
Buddy Harman (Elvis Presley, Patsy Cline, Roy Orbison)
Ian Haugland (Europe)
Steve Hewitt (Placebo)
Dominic Howard (Muse)
Gene Hoglan (Testament)
Tom Hunting (Exodus)
Mark Jackson (VNV Nation)
Steve Jansen (Japan, The Dolphin Brothers, Nine Horses)
Mika Karppinen (H.I.M.) plays open-handed
Stan Levey (Dizzy Gillespie, Charlie Parker, Frank Sinatra) right-handed and plays a complete left-handed kit
Buddy Miles (Band of Gypsys) plays right-handed kit, but leads left-handed
David Milhous (Lippy's Garden) right-handed and plays a complete left-handed kit
Rod Morgenstein (Dixie Dregs, Winger, Jelly Jam, Platypus)
Steve Negus (Saga)
Jerry Nolan (New York Dolls, The Heartbreakers)
Ian Paice (Deep Purple, Whitesnake)
Pat Pengelly (Bedouin Soundclash)
Slim Jim Phantom (Stray Cats)
Simon Phillips (Toto) plays open-handed  
Brett Reed (Rancid)
Neil Sanderson  (Three Days Grace) plays on a right-handed kit, but leads with left hand
Robert Schultzberg (Placebo)
Al Sobrante  (Green Day)
Ringo Starr (The Beatles, Ringo Starr & His All-Starr Band) plays on a right-handed kit, but leads with left hand
Sebastian Thomson (Baroness, Trans Am, Publicist)
Michael Urbano (Smash Mouth) plays on a right-handed kit, but leads with left hand
Hannes Van Dahl (Sabaton)
Joey Waronker (Beck, R.E.M.)
Javier Weyler (Stereophonics)
Fred White (Earth, Wind & Fire) 
Dennis Wilson (The Beach Boys) plays open-handed
Eliot Zigmund (Bill Evans, Vince Guaraldi)

Violinists
The violin can be learned in either hand, and most left-handed players hold the violin under the left side of their jaw, the same as right-handed players. This allows all violinists to sit together in an orchestra.
Richard Barth
Paavo Berglund (A well known Finnish left-handed conductor who also played violin, often joining orchestra players for chamber music just for fun. Due to the value of his violin collection he did not want to change his instruments and had trained himself to play left-handed on violins with a standard set-up.)
Charlie Chaplin (wrote right-handed)
Ornette Coleman
Rudolf Kolisch
Ashley MacIsaac

Ukulele
Paul McCartney
Tiny Tim (played guitar right handed)
Ian Whitcomb

Trumpet
Sharkey Bonano
Freddie 'Posey' Jenkins
Wingy Manone
Paul McCartney

Trombone
Slide Hampton

Banjo
Elizabeth Cotten
Cheick Hamala Diabate
Paul McCartney

Mandolin
Cheyenne Kimball
Paul McCartney

Bansuri
Hariprasad Chaurasia, right-handed, started his career playing the bansuri, a side-blown flute, right-handed, and switched to left-handed playing

References

Bibliography

External links
Left-handed guitarists and drummers
Famous Left Handed Guitarists and Bassists
Video about left-handed guitar playing

Left-handed
Guitars
Handedness